Theopompus (Theópompos; c. 380 BCc. 315 BC) was an ancient Greek historian and rhetorician.

Biography
Theopompus was born on the Aegean island of Chios. In early youth, he seems to have spent some time at Athens, along with his father, who had been exiled on account of his Laconian sympathies. Here he became a pupil of Isocrates, and rapidly made great progress in rhetoric; we are told that Isocrates used to say that Ephorus required the spur but Theopompus the bit.

At first he appears to have composed epideictic speeches, in which he attained to such proficiency that in 352–351 BC he gained the prize of oratory given by Artemisia II of Caria in honour of her husband, although Isocrates was himself among the competitors. It is said to have been the advice of his teacher that finally determined his career as an historian—a career for which he was peculiarly qualified owing to his abundant patrimony and his wide knowledge of men and places. Through the influence of Alexander, he was permitted to return to Chios about 333 BC, and figured for some time as one of the leaders of the aristocratic party in his native town. After Alexander's death he was again expelled, and took refuge with Ptolemy in Egypt, where he appears to have met with a somewhat cold reception. The date of his death is unknown.

Works
The works of Theopompus were chiefly historical, and are much quoted by later writers. They included an Epitome of Herodotus's Histories (whether this work is actually his is debated), the Hellenica (Ἑλληνικά), the History of Philip, and several panegyrics and hortatory addresses, the chief of which was the Letter to Alexander.

The Hellenica
The Hellenica treated of the history of Greece, in twelve books, from 411 (where Thucydides breaks off) to 394 BC — the date of the Battle of Cnidus. Of this work only a few fragments were known up till 1907. The papyrus fragment of a Greek historian of the 4th century BC, discovered by B. P. Grenfell and A. S. Hunt, and published by them in Oxyrhynchus Papyri (Vol. 5, 1908), has been recognized by Eduard Meyer, Ulrich von Wilamowitz-Moellendorff and Georg Busolt as a portion of the Hellenica. This identification has been disputed, however, by Friedrich Blass, J. B. Bury, E. M. Walker and others, most of whom attribute the fragment, which deals with the events of the year 395 BC and is of considerable extent, to Cratippus.

History of Philip II
A far more elaborate work was the history of Philip's reign (360–336 BC), with digressions on the names and customs of the various races and countries of which he had occasion to speak, which were so numerous that Philip V of Macedon reduced the bulk of the history from 58 to 16 books by cutting out those parts which had no connection with Macedonia. It was from this history that Trogus Pompeius (of whose Historiae Philippicae we possess the epitome by Justin) derived much of his material. Fifty-three books were extant in the time of Photius (9th century), who read them, and has left us an epitome of the 12th book. Several fragments, chiefly anecdotes and strictures of various kinds upon the character of nations and individuals, are preserved by Athenaeus, Plutarch and others. Of the Letter to Alexander we possess one or two fragments cited by Athenaeus, criticizing severely  the immorality and dissipations of Harpalus.

The artistic unity of his work suffered severely from the frequent and lengthy digressions, of which the most important was On the Athenian Demagogues in the 10th book of the Philippica, containing a bitter attack on many of the chief Athenian statesmen, and generally recognized as having been freely used by Plutarch in several of the Lives. The  is a lengthy digression inserted into books 8 and 9.

Another fault of Theopompus was his excessive fondness for romantic and incredible stories; a collection of some of these was afterwards made and published under his name. He was also severely blamed in antiquity for his censoriousness, and throughout his fragments no feature is more striking than this. On the whole, however, he appears to have been fairly impartial. Theompopus censures Philip severely for drunkenness and immorality while warmly praising Demosthenes.

Other works
The Attack upon Plato and the treatise On Piety, which are sometimes referred to as separate works, were perhaps only two of the many digressions in the history of Philip; some writers have doubted their authenticity.

The Three-headed, an attack on the cities of Athens, Sparta and Thebes, was published under the name of Theopompus by his enemy Anaximenes of Lampsacus. The nature of the extant fragments fully bears out the divergent criticisms of antiquity upon Theopompus.

In the work Philippica, Theopompus introduces a fictional island of Meropis as an Atlantis parody.

Mention by others
Aristotle mentions the conception and testimony of Theopompus about the innocuousness of slavery, in Politics. Jewish historian Flavius Josephus writes that Demetrius of Phalerum, in response to Ptolemy II Philadelphus asking why the Jewish Law had not been mentioned by any of his scribes or poets, told that due to the divine nature of the documents, any who endeavored to write about it had been afflicted by a distemper. He continued, saying that Theopompus once endeavored to write about the Jewish Law, but became disturbed in his mind for 30 days, whereupon during some intermission of his distemper he prayed for healing and determined to leave off his attempt to write, and was cured thereby. A passage from Theopompus is given by Athenaeus in his Deipnosophistae. Claudius Aelianus quotes both Theopompus and Lycus of Rhegium as sources on the cult practices of the Adriatic Veneti.

References

Citations

Sources

Further reading

External links

Classical-era Greek historians
Hellenistic-era historians
Ancient Greek political refugees
Ancient Greek rhetoricians
Ancient Chians
4th-century BC Greek people
4th-century BC historians
Courtiers of Philip II of Macedon